The 2014 World Snowshoe Championships was the 7th edition of the global snowshoe running competition, World Snowshoe Championships, organised by the World Snowshoe Federation and took place in Rättvik from 31 January to 1 February 2014.

Results
The race, held on the distance of 9 km, has compiled two different ranking (male and female) overall, it was the mass start system and more than 100 competitors participated.

Men's overall

Women's overall

References

External links
 World Snowshoe Federation official web site

World Snowshoe Championships